Onychodactylus fuscus, the Tadami clawed salamander, is a species of clawed salamander from Japan. It is known to occur in four different localities in the Fukushima and Niigata Prefectures, including Tadami and Sanjō. O. fuscus lives in streams and breeds during the winter. The species is closely related to Onychodactylus intermedius. It shares much of its habitat with O. japonicus, but the two species are reproductively isolated.

References

fuscus
Endemic amphibians of Japan
Amphibians described in 2014